Harry Glover (born 31 December 1995) is an English rugby union player. He has represented the England national rugby sevens team and plays for Stade Francais.

Early and personal life
London-born and educated at Rokeby School and Harrow School, Glover represented Middlesex from U14 level through to the U18 side. He studied politics and economics at Newcastle University. His brother Will is also a rugby player who has represented England at Sevens rugby.

Rugby career
He played more than 30 matches for England in the HSBC World Rugby Sevens Series and won two bronzes and a silver medal. He was then selected for the 2018 Rugby World Cup Sevens in San Francisco where England would lose in the final to New Zealand. He played again for England Sevens in the 2019-20 season.

Glover joined US Carcassonne in 2021 to play in the Rugby Pro D2 league in France. In May 2021 he was announced as signing for Stade Français for the 2021-22 season to compete in the Top 14.

References

External links
 

1995 births
Living people
England international rugby sevens players
English rugby union players
Rugby sevens players at the 2020 Summer Olympics
Olympic rugby sevens players of Great Britain
Commonwealth Games medallists in rugby sevens
Commonwealth Games bronze medallists for England
Rugby sevens players at the 2018 Commonwealth Games
Rugby union players from London
Medallists at the 2018 Commonwealth Games